Communauté d'agglomération du Pays Nord Martinique (often as CAP Nord Martinique) is an intercommunal structure in the French overseas department and region of Martinique. It was created in January 2014. Its seat is in Le Marigot. Its area is 547.9 km2. Its population was 100,347 in 2017.

Composition
The communauté d'agglomération consists of the following 18 communes:

L'Ajoupa-Bouillon
Basse-Pointe
Bellefontaine
Le Carbet
Case-Pilote
Fonds-Saint-Denis
Grand'Rivière
Gros-Morne
Le Lorrain
Macouba
Le Marigot
Le Morne-Rouge
Le Morne-Vert
Le Prêcheur
Le Robert
Sainte-Marie
Saint-Pierre
La Trinité

References

Pays Nord Martinique
Pays Nord Martinique